Nigel Bishop (born December 23, 1976 in St. George's, Grenada) is a Grenadian football player. He served as striker for the Grenada national football team.

External links

1976 births
Living people
Grenadian footballers
Grenada international footballers
People from St. George's, Grenada
Association football forwards
20th-century Grenadian people